Steven Underhill (born 1962) is an American photographer. He grew up in Northern California and graduated from University of California, Los Angeles.

He has produced seven photo books featuring nude and semi-nude male models, titled Straight Boys, Twins, Jeff, Boys Next Door, Happy 2gether, Straight Boys Volume 2, and Rassle. He is best known for photographing identical twins Bruce and Seth Hall.

Steven Underhill was an early contributor to the gay youth publication XY Magazine.

Published works
Straight Boys (1997, 2004; English and German); 
Twins (1999; also known as Frisky Memories);
Jeff (1999); 
Boy Next Door (2000); 
Happy 2gether (2003); 
Straight boys Volume 2 (2004; English and German); 
Rassle (2006; English and German);

References

External links
Steven Underhill's official website
Steven Underhill's homoerotica Facebook fan page
Steven Underhill's podcast page with NSFW homoerotica images and video
Website featuring some of Steven Underhill's latest work, collaborating with the original founders of XY magazine, launching new magazine "B"
Website featuring Steven Underhill's work
Steven Underhill's Myspace Page.

1962 births
Living people
Photographers from California
Fashion photographers
University of California, Los Angeles alumni